Seyyed Abbas (also Romanized as Seyyed ʿAbbās) is a village in Osmanvand Rural District, Firuzabad District, Kermanshah County, Kermanshah Province, Iran. At the 2006 census, its population was 56, in 15 families.

References 

Populated places in Kermanshah County